Ágios Dimítrios is a settlement on the Greek island of Lemnos.

In popular culture 
In the military sandbox video game Arma 3, the city is depicted as the fictional village of Agios Dionysios, along with the rest of Lemnos as the fictional nation of Altis.

Populated places in Lemnos